FUSION: Science, Pirate, Secular, Climate Emergency, commonly known as Fusion Party Australia or Fusion, is a political party in Australia created by the merging of the Science Party, Pirate Party, Secular Party, Vote Planet, and Climate Change Justice Party.

Formation
The party was formed in 2022 following the passing of the Electoral Legislation Amendment (Party Registration Integrity) Bill 2021 to amend the Commonwealth Electoral Act 1918. The effects of the legislation included increasing the minimum membership requirement for non-parliamentary parties from 500 to 1,500 unique members and new party naming rules, in order to "[ensure] there exists a genuine base of community support for political parties and reduce the risk of voter confusion".

Climate Emergency Action Alliance: Vote Planet remained registered for federal elections and undertook a name change to FUSION: Science, Pirate, Secular, Climate Emergency in March 2022. In the course of the amalgamation, the Science Party and Secular Party were deregistered in January 2022 by the Australian Electoral Commission (AEC). The Pirate Party was deregistered in April 2021.

Fusion has a federated structure, with the merging former parties retaining a degree of autonomy as formal branches.

Ideology and policies
It describes itself as "A party determined to secure a safe climate and environment, a humanist society, and free culture, held together by science". The party supports the separation of church and state referring to its policy as secular humanism. It supports removing religious prayers, rituals, and bias from government and public institutions and their documentation, and abolishing blasphemy laws. It supports a transparent government, such as disclosure of political donations above $1000, open access to advice behind policy decisions and removal of restrictions of speech on public servants. It also defines itself as anti-corruption and wants to create an anti-corruption commission and implement protections for whistleblowers and activists. The party also wants to enshrine network neutrality and freedom of expression in law, supports freedom of speech, the creation of a constitutional bill of rights and removing bans on voluntary euthanasia to decriminalise physician-assisted dying.

Fusion supports lowering the voting age to 16-years-old, but retaining the current obligation age to vote at 18-years-old, as well as introducing electoral education into the high school curriculum. The party supports the legalisation of cannabis in Australia, with similar laws and regulations to how alcohol is controlled in the country. It also supports animal welfare in terms of aspects such as incentivising meat alternatives, and alternative protein sources, such as lab grown meat. It also supports ending feed lots and factory farming, ending live export of animals for food, and establishing an Independent Office of Animal Welfare. The party has stated its support for "the reintroduction of stronger media ownership laws that cap ownership share by any one corporation". The party also supports a universal basic income (UBI) in the form of a direct payment of $500 per week or equivalent tax credit to every Australian citizen aged over 18-years-old.

In terms of foreign policy, Fusion advocates for "responsible global citizenship", which involves supporting human rights worldwide, providing aid to other countries and helping asylum seekers.

Member parties

Electoral results 
The Fusion Party fielded Senate candidates in the 2022 federal election in every mainland state, polling a national total of 51,676 votes (0.34%). The party also ran candidates in nine lower-house seats, with their best lower-house result being 2.16% of primary votes in the Division of Dobell.

See also

 Environmental issues in Australia
 Environmental movement in Australia
 Euthanasia in Australia
 Free-culture movement
 Humanism
 Irreligion in Australia
 List of political parties in Australia
 Secularism
 Separation of church and state in Australia

References

External links 
 Fusion Party website
 Fusion Party Twitter
 Fusion Party Facebook

2022 establishments in Australia
Environmentalism in Australia
Euthanasia in Australia
Free culture movement
Freedom of expression
Humanist parties
Political parties established in 2022
Political parties in Australia
Secular humanism
Secularism in Australia
Secularism
Political parties supporting universal basic income
Whistleblowing in Australia